Himmaste (Võro: Himmastõ) is a settlement in Põlva Parish, Põlva County in southeastern Estonia.

Folklorist, theologist, linguist and national awakening figure Jakob Hurt (1839–1907) was born as the son of a local schoolteacher in Himmaste.

References

External links
Satellite map at Maplandia.com

Villages in Põlva County
Kreis Werro